Mordarski is a Polish surname. Notable people with the surname include:

Ryszard Mordarski (born 1976), Polish slalom canoeist
Sławomir Mordarski (born 1979), Polish slalom canoeist, brother of Ryszard
Zdzisław Mordarski (1922–1991), Polish footballer

Polish-language surnames